Władysław Kazimierz Kawula (27 September 1937 – 1 February 2008) was a Polish footballer. Kawula played for Prądniczanka Kraków, Wisła Kraków, White Eagles Chicago, Victoria Jaworzno and Kalwarianka Kalwaria over the course of his career. He died on 1 February 2008 at 4:12 PM (15:12 GMT), aged 70. The Prądniczanka stadium is named in his honour.

Career
Kawula joined Wisła Kraków in 1951, at the young age of 20 years and went on to score 26 goals in 329 appearances, which is still a club record to date.

During his time as a White Star player, Kawula was part of the 1967 Polish Cup winning team. He also captained the team on many occasions.

Kawula left Wisła Kraków to join White Eagles Chicago in 1971. He returned to Poland two years later and played in the lower leagues for Victoria Jaworzno and Kalwarianka Kalwaria.

On 28 September 1960 Kawula played his first game for Poland in a game against France. He went on to make another four appearances for his country.

Honours

With Wisła Kraków (1951–1971)
 Orange Ekstraklasa - Runners Up: 1951, 1966
 Polish Cup Winner: 1967
 Polish Cup Runners Up: 1951, 1954

References

1937 births
2008 deaths
Footballers from Kraków
Wisła Kraków players
Victoria Jaworzno players
Poland international footballers
Polish footballers
Polish expatriate footballers
Expatriate soccer players in the United States
Polish expatriate sportspeople in the United States
Association football defenders